The 1977 Widener Pioneers football team represented Widener University as a member of the Middle Atlantic Conference (MAC) during the 1977 NCAA Division III football season. The team won the 1977 NCAA Division III national championship.

Season overview
In their ninth season under head coach Bill Manlove, the Pride compiled an 11–1 record and won the NCAA Division III championship.

The Fordham loss was followed by a 10-game winning streak. In the NCAA Division III playoffs, the Pioneers shut out  (17–0) on the road. In the semifinals, the Pioneers defeated  as Chip Zawoiski carried a record 31 times for 171 rushing yards.

In the Amos Alonzo Stagg Bowl, Widener faced . The Pioneers won, 39–36, in a game that featured five lead changes.  Widener ultimately pulled ahead with two fourth-quarter touchdowns on passes of 25 and 70 yards from Mark Walter to Walker Carter.

The team played its home games in Chester, Pennsylvania.

Statistical leaders and awards
The team's statistical leaders included senior tailback Chip Zawoiski with 1,576 rushing yards and 21 touchdowns and quarterback Mark Walter with 1,312 passing yards and 15 touchdowns. 

Zawoiski was named the MAC most valuable player (tying with John Green of Franklin Y Marshall), and coach Manlove received MAC Coach of the Year honors for the fourth consecutive year. A total of ten Widener players received first-team All-MAC honors: Zawoiski; split end Walker Carter; offensive tackle Bob Brewster; offensive guard Andy Martin; kicker John Ferko; defensive end Tim Erlacher; defensive tackle Jim "Bubba" Carter; linebackers Eddie Fulmer and Wayne Pierce; and defensive back Ted Kukawaski.

The 1977 team was inducted as a group into the Widener Athletics Hall of Fame in 2007.

Schedule

References

Widener
Widener Pride football seasons
NCAA Division III Football Champions
Widener football